Avelyn Medford (12 September 1912 – 22 May 1991) was a Barbadian cricketer. He played in one first-class match for the Barbados cricket team in 1938/39.

See also
 List of Barbadian representative cricketers

References

External links
 

1912 births
1991 deaths
Barbadian cricketers
Barbados cricketers
People from Christ Church, Barbados